Simrit Kaur, also known mononymously as Simrit, is a singer/songwriter born in Athens, Greece. She moved to the southeast in the United States as a toddler and currently resides in California.

Music career (2010–present) 
Her own independent label, Simrit Kaur Music LLC, released her album The Sweetest Nectar in 2010, which was produced by Simrit with the help of Ram Dass Khalsa and Todd Boston
In 2013, Simrit released The Oracle Sessions. Simrit co-produced the album with Anthony Molina of Mercury Rev.
In 2014, Simrit released her album titled Simrit, produced by Paul Mahern. Belinda Carlisle is featured on the album track “Kudrat Kavan”.
The album reached #2 on iTunes World Chart that year. In 2015, her album From The Ancient Storm was named one of the "10 Best Yoga Albums of the Year" by Yoga Journal and reached #1 on iTunes World Chart as well as reached #3 on Billboard's New Age Chart.
Her release, Songs of Resilience (2016), was ranked as #1 on iTunes World Chart and #6 on Billboard's New Age Chart. Her release Live, Spring 2017 reached #1 on iTunes World Music Charts in United States, Australia and United Kingdom and reached #8 on Billboard's New Age Chart. Her release When We Return debuted #1 on the World Music charts on iTunes on December 11, 2019. Her latest release Live in Los Angeles 2019  released on April 25, 2020 and reached #1 on the World Music iTunes chart.

Discography

Albums

Singles

References

External links 
 

Year of birth missing (living people)
Living people
Adoptees